Priaires is a former commune in the Deux-Sèvres department in western France. On 1 January 2019, it was merged into the new commune Val-du-Mignon.

See also
Communes of the Deux-Sèvres department

References

Former communes of Deux-Sèvres